Raúl Morales Beltramí (December 8, 1906 – February 12, 1946) was a Chilean politician and physician. He was born in Santiago, Chile, the son of Guillermo Morales and Emilia Beltrami. He studied at the University of Chile. After his career as a physician, he was a member of the Independent Radical Party. He died in Rio de Janeiro, Brazil on February 12, 1946.

References 

1906 births
1946 deaths
People from Santiago
Chilean people of Spanish descent
Radical Party of Chile politicians
Chilean Ministers of the Interior
Deputies of the XXXVIII Legislative Period of the National Congress of Chile
Ambassadors of Chile to Brazil
University of Chile alumni